This is a list of football venues in Mali: These are stadiums where professional and semi-professional Association football clubs in Mali play. A minimum capacity of 5,000 is required.

Existing stadiums

1Used for training

See also 
List of association football stadiums by capacity
List of African stadiums by capacity

References

Mali: Football association, FIFA.
RSSSF 2007/08 football competition history

 
Mali
Football stadiums
Football stadiums